The 2015 NACRA Rugby Championship, the eighth edition of the NACRA Rugby Championship, is a rugby union championship for Tier 3 North American and Caribbean teams. Pool play will take place between 28 February and 18 April. A championship game, as well as promotion/relegation matches, will follow.

The championship is split between North and South zones, which each have a three-team Championship. The North Zone has a three-team Cup, while the South Zone has a four-team Cup. The winner of each Championship play for the final, championship game, and a promotion/relegation game is played in each zone, between the winner of the Cup, and the last place team of the Championship.

Competition points are different from most rugby union tournaments: Two points are awarded for a win, one for a draw. There are also bonus points for scoring four tries and for losing within a margin of 7 points or less.

Teams 

Thirteen teams will take place in this year's tournament. They are seeded into two pools based on their regional rankings.

There are two notable changes from last year: Mexico has replaced Bermuda in the North Championship, and Jamaica is no longer participating.

North Zone

North Zone Championship

Pre-tournament World Rugby Rankings in parentheses.  USA South is not a full member of World Rugby.
Games

North Zone Cup

Pre-tournament World Rugby Rankings in parentheses.  Turks & Caicos Islands are not a full member of World Rugby.
Games

North Zone Championship relegation play-off

South Zone

South Zone Championship

Pre-tournament World Rugby Rankings in parentheses.
Games

South Zone Cup

Pre-tournament World Rugby Rankings in parentheses.  British Virgin Islands, Curaçao and St Lucia are not full members of World Rugby.
Games

South Zone Championship relegation play-off

Final 
The champions of the north and south zone championship, Mexico and Trinidad and Tobago respectively, faced off in the NACRA Championship final.  Trinidad and Tobago, as the higher ranked team, earned the right to host the match at St Mary's College Sports Ground on 25 April 2015.

Trinidad and Tobago won their third NACRA Championship, defeating first time finalists, Mexico, in the final 30-16.

Related Page 
 NACRA Rugby Championship

References

External links 
 NACRA Website

2015
2015 rugby union tournaments for national teams
2015 in North American rugby union
rugby union